Baron Balfour of Inchrye, of Shefford in the County of Berkshire, was a title in the Peerage of the United Kingdom. It was created in the 1945 Birthday Honours for the Conservative politician Harold Balfour. He represented the Isle of Thanet in the House of Commons and served as Under-Secretary of State for Air from 1938 to 1944.

His son Ian, the second Baron, succeeded in 1988. He was a historian and composer. He died in 2013, leaving a daughter, the Hon. Roxane Laird Craig, but no male heir.

Barons Balfour of Inchyre (1945)
Harold Harington Balfour, 1st Baron Balfour of Inchrye (1897–1988)
Ian Balfour, 2nd Baron Balfour of Inchrye (1924–2013)

References

Extinct baronies in the Peerage of the United Kingdom
Noble titles created in 1945
Noble titles created for UK MPs
Baron Balfour of Inchyre